The Kansas City, Clinton and Springfield Railway, also known as the Leaky Roof Railway, is a now abandoned rail line that ran from Olathe, Kansas, near Kansas City, through Clinton, Missouri, and on to Ash Grove, Missouri, where it tied in with the Kansas City, Fort Scott and Memphis Railway, later the Frisco Railroad. A short branch line served Pleasant Hill, Missouri. It was founded in 1884, as a subsidiary of the KCFS&G; on February 12, 1885, the railroad was incorporated in Missouri. The line was later bought by the Frisco (St. Louis-San Francisco Railway) in 1928. After consolidation with the Frisco, the route was deemed redundant to the parallel and better constructed Frisco "Highline". Seeking to cut costs, the Frisco chose to abandon the line in 1934. Because it ran parallel to the Frisco's Highline, the two railroads intersected at many places. Thus, the Frisco chose to consolidate the two lines into one by keeping the track of whichever railroad had the favorable route between these numerous crossings. The less favorable sections were then removed. Service continued over these portions of the line with a daily except Sunday local until the mid-1970s, when dam construction and bridge fires ended through service on the route between Kansas City and Springfield, Missouri. Operating for a while as a North and South branch line, services were cut and the line was, section by section, successively abandoned. Although the rails are now gone, traces can be found along Route 7 and Route 13, however along most sections, little remains to be seen.

See also 
List of predecessors of the St. Louis–San Francisco Railway.

References
The Historical Guide to North American Railroads, 2nd Edition, Kalmbach Books.
History of the Leaky Roof Railway
Map of the KCC&S and KCOS&S

Predecessors of the St. Louis–San Francisco Railway
Defunct Kansas railroads
Defunct Missouri railroads
Railway companies established in 1885
Railway companies disestablished in 1928